METRO is one of the leading supermarket chains in Cyprus.  It currently operates with 3 stores in Nicosia and 1 store in Larnaca, one in Limassol and one in Paralimni. 

In October 1982, METRO Foods Trading Ltd was established with its first hypermarket in Larnaca.

External links
 

Economy of Cyprus
Retail companies established in 1982
Supermarkets of Cyprus